Ji Hyeon-ok (1961 – 1999) was a South Korean mountaineer.

Born in Nonsan, she climbed several of the tallest mountains in the world, including Denali (Mount McKinley) in 1988, Mount Everest, in 1993, becoming the first Korean woman to do so, Gasherbrum I, in 1997 and Gasherbrum II, in 1998.

On April 29, 1999, she went missing while climbing the Annapurna; Ji set foot on the peak but failed to return to the base camp.

On 20 January 2015, Google Doodle commemorated her 56th birthday.

References

1961 births
1999 deaths
South Korean mountain climbers
People from Nonsan
South Korean summiters of Mount Everest
Mountaineering deaths
Sportspeople from South Chungcheong Province